Bernd Pichler (born 26 December 1969) is a German biomedical engineer and expert in preclinical and molecular imaging as well as in imaging technology. He is Chair of the Department of Preclinical Imaging and Radiopharmacy as well as Director of the Werner Siemens Imaging Center at the University of Tübingen, Germany. He is the dean of the Faculty of Medicine of the University of Tübingen and member of the University Hospital Executive Board of Directors.

Life 
Pichler grew up in Pfaffenhofen an der Ilm in Bavaria. After completing his high school education, he studied electrical engineering and biomedical engineering at the Technical University of Munich, Germany. Following his degree, he worked as a PhD student at the Clinic for Nuclear Medicine at the Technical University of Munich and the Max Planck Institute for Physics (Werner Heisenberg Institute). After gaining his doctoral degree (Dr. rer. nat.) in 2001, he initially worked as a post-doctoral research fellow at the Clinic of Nuclear Medicine. He moved to the University of California, Davis, as an Assistance Research Engineer (equal to Assistant Research Professor) in March 2003 and worked in the Department of Biomedical Engineering. 

In January 2005, Pichler became Head of the Laboratory for Preclinical Imaging and Imaging Technology at the University of Tübingen and successfully completed his habilitation there in 2007. He has been a Full Professor at the University of Tübingen since 2008 and also Chair of the Department of Preclinical Imaging and Radiopharmacy at the Clinic of Radiology, which is part of University Hospital Tübingen, since January 2011. His professorship is funded by the Werner Siemens Foundation, which has its headquarters in Switzerland. 

In May 2020, Pichler was elected dean of the Medical Faculty of the University of Tübingen.

Research
Pichler is primarily conducting research in the development of new imaging processes for fundamental pre-clinical research and clinical usage. He played a major role in the development of an imaging procedure which combines positron emission tomography (PET) and magnetic resonance tomography (MRT) in one device (PET/MR). The laboratory headed by Pichler primarily focuses on fundamental research into new diagnosis and treatment methods in the fields of oncology, neurology, cardiology and immunology. He is holder and applicant of many patents on integrated PET/MR scanners and radioactive tracers.

Awards & achievements
Advanced Grant from the European Research Council, 2012 

Member of the Advisory Council of the Werner Siemens Foundation, 2012

President of the European Society for Molecular Imaging (ESMI), 2014/2015

Elected Member of the German Academy of Science and Engineering (acatech), 2015

Elected Member of the German National Academy of Sciences Leopoldina, 2017

Spokesperson of the Clusters of Excellence ‘Image-Guided and Functionally Instructed Tumor Therapies (iFIT)’ granted to the University of Tübingen by the German Research Foundation (Deutsche Forschungsgemeinschaft), 2019

Selected publications

References

External links

1969 births
Living people
Biomedical engineers
German bioengineers
Academic staff of the University of Tübingen
Technical University of Munich alumni
People from Pfaffenhofen (district)
Engineers from Bavaria
Members of the German Academy of Sciences Leopoldina